Blood Circus may refer to:

 Blood Circus (film)
 Blood Circus (band)